Gordon Dester Kaufman (22 June 1925 – 22 July 2011) was an American theologian and the Mallinckrodt Professor of Divinity at Harvard Divinity School, where he taught for over three decades beginning in 1963. He also taught at Pomona College and Vanderbilt University, and lectured in India, Japan, South Africa, England, and Hong Kong.  Kaufman was an ordained minister in the Mennonite Church for 50 years.

Early years
Kaufman was born on June 22, 1925, in North Newton, Kansas. He earned a Bachelor of Arts degree from Bethel College in 1947. He earned his Master of Arts degree in sociology from Northwestern University in 1948, a Bachelor of Divinity degree from Yale Divinity School in 1951, and a Doctor of Philosophy degree in philosophical theology from Yale University in 1955. His dissertation was titled The Problem of Relativism and the Possibility of Metaphysics. In 1961–1962 he completed a postdoctoral fellowship as a Fulbright Fellow at the University of Tübingen in Germany.

Career
In addition to Kaufman's long tenure at Harvard Divinity School, he was a past president of the American Academy of Religion (1982) and of the American Theological Society, as well as a member of the Society for Buddhist-Christian Studies. Kaufman was the author of 13 books, which influenced how many mainline Christians have considered God language and religious naturalism. Among these are An Essay on Theological Method, God The Problem, Theology for a Nuclear Age, and In the Face of Mystery. This last work earned him the 1995 American Academy of Religion Award for excellence among constructive books in religion. He participated for many years in the discussions on religious naturalism at the Highlands Institute for American Religious and Philosophical Thought and the Institute on Religion in an Age of Science (Lecturer 2006)    He was the subject of two Festschriften.

Views on God
In a review of Kaufman's In The Beginning ... Creativity:

In a second review of In the Beginning ... Creativity:

 

Kaufman in his Prairie View lectures says:

 
A Zygon abstract on a Kaufman article states:

God as mystery
For Kaufman, the only "available referent" for the word God is the construct we hold in our minds, a construct that has developed over the centuries. There may be a "real referent", but even if there is, it remains "a transcendent unknown". Thus, Kaufman thinks of God as "ultimate mystery". He does not speculate whether there is an "extra-human reality" called God. Thus, as a theologian, he views his work as dealing with "profound, ultimately unfathomable, mystery". Hence the resultant is a "theology within the limits of reason alone", holding with Kant the imaginative construction of basic concepts of religious ideas. Thus, Kaufman developed a "generic theology" for postmodern Christians of "an utterly transcendent God".

The "ultimate mystery" called "God" serves as a living symbol in our culture. For many people, it functions as the primary point for "orientation and devotion." Being oriented on the "ultimate mystery in things" is an awareness of one's "bafflement of mind" over the mystery "that there is something and not nothing." When the mystery is thought of as God, it evokes not only bafflement but trust and confidence.

Works
In Face of Mystery: A Constructive Theology  - Harvard University Press (October 7, 1993), 
Jesus and Creativity - Fortress Press (July 30, 2006), 
In the Beginning-- Creativity - Augsburg Fortress Publishers (July 2004), 
God, Mystery, Diversity: Christian Theology In A Pluralistic World - Augsburg Fortress Publishers (March 1, 1996), 
An Essay on Theological Method, An American Academy of Religion Book; 3rd edition (January 2, 1995), 
Theology for a Nuclear Age  - Westminster John Knox Press (May 1985), 
Theology an Imaginative Construction -  Edwards Brothers (1982), ASIN: B0016JFF9A
The Theological Imagination  - Westminster John Knox Press; 1st edition (January 1, 1981), 
Nonresistance and Responsibility, and Other Mennonite Essays -  Faith & Life Press (June 1979), 
God the Problem  - Harvard University Press (December 12, 1972), 
Systematic Theology  - Scribner's (1968), ASIN: B001OXJ7DS
The Context of Decision;: A Theological Analysis - Abingdon Press; 1st edition (1961), ASIN: B0007EB8QY
Relativism, Knowledge, and Faith  - University of Chicago Press (1960), ASIN: B001P5RABQ
Theology at the End of Modernity: Essays in Honor of Gordon D. Kaufman  - Co-editors Sheila Greeve Davaney  &  Gordon D. Kaufman, Trinity Pr Intl (October 1991), 
Mennonite Theology in Face of Modernity: Essays in Honor of Gordon D. Kaufman - Cornelius H. Wedel Historical Series 9, co-editors Gordon D. Kaufman & Alain Epp Weaver - Bethel College (July 1996) -

See also
Christian agnosticism
Constructive theology
Liberal Christianity
Mennonites
Postchristianity
Post-theism
Progressive Christianity
Spiritual naturalism
Ursula Goodenough

References

Footnotes

Bibliography

External links
 Interview with Gordon D. Kaufman, Harvard Divinity School, February 2009
HDS obituary for Gordon Kaufman 
Gordon Kaufman Resource Page

Harvard Divinity School faculty
American Christian theologians
American religious writers
Religious naturalists
American Mennonites
1925 births
2011 deaths
Presidents of the American Academy of Religion
Yale Divinity School alumni
Northwestern University alumni
Mennonite theologians
Mennonite writers
Pomona College faculty
Vanderbilt University faculty